Fonte Cónego is a subdivision of the city of Mindelo in the island of São Vicente, Cape Verde. Its population was 236 at the 2010 census. It is situated directly east of the city centre. Adjacent neighborhoods include Alto Miramar to the northwest, Alto Santo António to the north, Alto Solarine/Forca to the northeast and Ribeira Bote to the south.

References

Mindelo